Cora aturucoa is a species of basidiolichen in the family Hygrophoraceae. It was formally described as a new species in 2016 by Robert Lücking, Bibiana Moncada, and Carlos Alberto Vargas. The specific epithet aturucoa uses an acronym of the Asociación de Turismo Rural Comunitario Bogotá, Ciudad Bolívar, an organisation that manages the trail where the new lichen was found. Cora aturucoa is a saxicolous lichen that grows in the high Andean forest zone of Colombia. Cora elephas  is a closely related species.

References

aturucoa
Lichen species
Lichens described in 2016
Lichens of Colombia
Taxa named by Robert Lücking
Basidiolichens